Avon was abolished in 1996 both as a county council and a ceremonial county, but the name Avon continues to be used unofficially in subsequent boundary reviews as presented by the Boundary Commission for England to describe the area covered by the former county for the purpose of the rules which strongly deter cross-council constituencies (spanning more than one local authority within its area).

The Boundary Commission for England reviewed Avon in 2000 and devised a constituencies scheme in which no constituency spanned the four unitary authority boundaries within the abolished county. This entailed four seats to Bristol, three to South Gloucestershire and two each to Bath and North East Somerset and North Somerset and accordingly a net increase of one seat. Constituency names were aligned with the new local council names. These changes were implemented at the 2010 general election. Bath was restored as a borough constituency (to which a different election expenses quota and returning officer applies compared to county constituencies). Thus Avon has 6 Borough constituencies and 5 County constituencies.

The immediate predecessor constituency definitions had persisted, with slight amendments in 1997, from before the general election in 1983 to that of 2005. The area had been used as a convenient unit for division into ten parliamentary constituencies (five borough constituencies and five county constituencies).

Constituencies

2010 boundary changes
Under the Fifth Periodic Review of Westminster constituencies, the Boundary Commission for England decided to increase the number of seats which covered "Avon" from 10 to 11, with the creation of Filton and Bradley Stoke. This resulted in major changes to Kingswood and three of the four Bristol constituencies. A further three constituencies were renamed.

(The maps on this page do not show the nominal extensions of several constituencies over the waters of the Bristol Channel.)

Other former constituencies in the area were:
Bristol Central abolished 1974
Bristol South East abolished 1983
Bristol North East abolished 1983
South Gloucestershire abolished 1983

Proposed boundary changes 
See 2023 Periodic Review of Westminster constituencies for further details.

Following the abandonment of the Sixth Periodic Review (the 2018 review), the Boundary Commission for England formally launched the 2023 Review on 5 January 2021. Initial proposals were published on 8 June 2021 and, following two periods of public consultation, revised proposals were published on 8 November 2022. Final proposals will be published by 1 July 2023.

The commission has proposed that "Avon" (covering the Bath and North East Somerset, Bristol, North Somerset, and South Gloucestershire council areas) be combined with Devon and Somerset as a sub-region of the South West Region, resulting in significant change to the existing pattern of constituencies. In Avon, Bristol West, Kingswood and North East Somerset would disappear, being replaced by Bristol Central, Bristol North East, and North East Somerset and Hanham. In addition, Frome, and Wells and Mendip Hills would be established as cross-authority boundary seats. The following seats are proposed:

Containing electoral wards from Bath and North East Somerset

Bath
Frome (parts also in the Somerset Districts of Mendip and South Somerset)
North East Somerset and Hanham (part)
Containing electoral wards in Bristol
Bristol Central
Bristol East
Bristol North East (part)
Bristol North West
Bristol South
Containing electoral wards in North Somerset

North Somerset
Wells and Mendip Hills (parts also in Somerset Districts of Mendip and Sedgemoor)
Weston-super-Mare

Containing electoral wards in South Gloucestershire
Filton and Bradley Stoke
North East Somerset and Hanham (part)
North East Bristol (part)
Thornbury and Yate

Results history
Primary data source: House of Commons research briefing - General election results from 1918 to 2019

2019 
The number of votes cast for each political party who fielded candidates in constituencies comprising Avon in the 2019 general election were as follows:

Percentage votes 

11983 & 1987 - Alliance of Liberal Party and Social Democratic Party

* Included in Other

Seats 

11983 & 1987 - Alliance of Liberal Party and Social Democratic Party

Maps

Historical representation by party

See also

 List of constituencies in South West England

Notes and references
References

Notes

 Avon
Avon
Politics of South Gloucestershire District
Avon (county)